Yi Won (born Yi Sang-Hyeob on 23 September 1962) is a great-grandson of Gojong of Korea and one of several who claim to be current head of the House of Yi. He worked as a general manager of Hyundai Home Shopping, a Hyundai Department Store Group company, until Prince Yi Ku died on 16 July 2005. He was born as the eldest son of Yi Gap, the 9th son of Prince Yi Kang by one of his partners at Hyehwa-dong, Jongno-gu, Seoul. After the death of Yi Ku, it was decided to make Yi Won to be the adopted heir to the late prince by the Jeonju Lee Royal Family Association; Yi Won was later announced to be the director of the association on 27 June 2007. Officially, as noble titles aren't recognized by the Constitution of South Korea, Yi Won is by birth a citizen in South Korea.

Biography 

Yi Won attended the Sangmun High School during 1979–1981 and completed studies in broadcasting at the New York Institute of Technology, United States. He and his wife have had two children, the eldest son, Yi Kwon (이권), born in 1998; the other son, Yi Yeong (이영), born in 1999.

He currently lives in an apartment in Wondang, Goyang, Gyeonggi province, South Korea with his family.

Adoption controversy 

Following the death of Yi Ku, who died on 16 July 2005, the Jeonju Lee Royal Family Association appointed him as the next Head of the Korean Imperial Household and they also made his title the Hereditary Prince Imperial (Hwangsason) in the meaning of inherited a title of Yi Ku. According to the chairman of the association, Lee Hwan-ey (이환의, 李桓儀), in his last meeting with Yi Ku was on July 10, Yi Won was allowed to become his heir and Yi Ku signed for granting permission. Another meeting held on July 21, within the association, was to determine whether Yi Won could be the successor of Yi Ku. Eventually, Yi Won's status as Yi Ku's successor was confirmed by the Jeonju Lee Royal Family Association as of 22 July 2005.

This claim was contested by his half-aunt, Yi Hae-won, who was crowned "Empress of  Korea" by some of her relatives. In spite of this, he is annually called on to take the place of the sovereign at the Jongmyo jerye ceremonies performing rites to his royal ancestors.

Those who dispute the legitimacy of the adoption claim that consent for the adoption of Yi Won was not given by other members of Imperial House, including Yi Seok, the younger half-brother of Prince Gap, and Yi Hae-won, the eldest member of the house before her death in 2020. Also, Yi Ku died before the adoption process could complete; as such, according to present Korean law, a traditional posthumous adoption was no longer recognized by legislation as of 2004.

Ancestry

Patrilineal descent

 Yi Han, d. 754? 
 Yi Jayeon
 Yi Cheonsang
 Yi Gwanghui
 Yi Ipjeon
 Yi Geunghyu
 Yi Yeomsoon
 Yi Seung-sak 
 Yi Chung-kyung
 Yi Kyung-young
 Yi Chung-min
 Yi Hwa
 Yi Jinyu 
 Yi Gung-jin 
 Yi Yong-bu 
 Yi Rin
 Yi Yang-mu, d. 1231
 Yi An-sa, d. 1274 
 Yi Haeng-ni
 Yi Chun, d. 1342 
 Yi Jachun, 1315-1361
 Taejo of Joseon, 1335-1408
 Taejong of Joseon, 1367-1422
 Sejong of Joseon, 1397-1450
 Sejo of Joseon, 1417-1468
 Crown Prince Uigyeong, 1438-1457
 Seongjong of Joseon, 1457-1495
 Jungjong of Joseon, 1488-1544
 Grand Internal Prince Deokheung, 1530-1559
 Seonjo of Joseon, 1552-1608
 Prince Jeongwon, 1580-1619
 Injo of Joseon, 1595-1649
 Grand Prince Inpyeong, 1622-1658
 Prince Boknyeong, 1639-1670
 Yi Hyuk, Prince Uiwon, 1661-1722
 Yi Sook, Prince Anheung, 1693-1768
 Yi Jin-ik, 1728-1796
 Yi Byeong-won, 1752-1822
 Yi Gu, Prince Namyeon, 1788-1836
 Grand Internal Prince Heungseon, 1820-1898 
 Gojong of Korea, 1852-1919
 Prince Yi Kang, 1877-1955
 Yi Gap, 1938-2014
 Yi Won, b. 1962

See also

House of Yi
Joseon Dynasty

References

External links 

 Coronation of Korea’s new empress leads to royal family controversy
 English Donga article mentioning Yi Won

Pretenders to the Korean throne
House of Yi
1962 births
Living people
People from Gyeonggi Province
Korean anti-communists
Korean princes
New York Institute of Technology alumni